Moel Arthur ("Arthur's Hill") is an Iron Age hillfort in Flintshire, Wales, at the boundary with Denbighshire, about  east of Denbigh.

It is on a prominent hill, height , in the Clwydian Range; it overlooks the Vale of Clwyd to the west. Offa's Dyke Path skirts the hill.

Description
There are two large banks and ditches to the north, where the hill slope is not steep; above the steep south-west, south and east slopes there is a single bank. At the north-east, at the edge of the steeper slopes, there is a narrow inturned entrance with an oblique approach. The form of entrance, and the simple plan of the fort, suggest that it is an early example.

Within the fortifications, there is a rounded summit. In the north and east of the interior there is a broad terrace, and building platforms have been found.

There was excavation in 1849 by Wynne Ffoulkes. He found "coarse red Roman pottery" which has not been preserved; it is not known if it was Roman, which would suggest occupation into the Roman period, or prehistoric. He found traces of a drystone construction, destroyed during the excavation, near the south of the entrance. In 1962, three copper Bronze Age axes were found within the defences.

See also
 Hillforts in Britain
 List of Scheduled Monuments in Flintshire

References

External links
 

Hillforts in Flintshire
Hillforts in Denbighshire
Scheduled monuments in Flintshire
Mountains and hills of Flintshire